Edolphus "Ed" Towns Jr. (born July 21, 1934) is an American politician who served in the United States House of Representatives from 1983 to 2013. A Democrat from New York, Towns was Chairman of the House Oversight and Government Reform Committee from 2009 to 2011.

On April 16, 2012, Towns announced he would be retiring at the end of his 15th term.

Early life, education, and early career
Towns was born in Chadbourn, North Carolina, the son of Versie (née Brown) and Edolphus Towns. He graduated from West Side High School, Chadbourn, North Carolina in 1952. He earned a bachelor's degree in sociology from North Carolina A&T State University in 1956 and a master's degree in social work from Adelphi University in 1973. Towns is a member of Phi Beta Sigma fraternity.

Towns was an administrator at Beth Israel Medical Center, a professor at New York's Medgar Evers College and Fordham University, and a public school teacher teaching orientation and mobility to blind students. In 1956, he joined the United States Army as a private and received basic combat training at Fort Hood, Texas with the 4th Armored Division. He served until 1958. He was also an ordained Baptist minister.

In 1970, he ran for New York Assembly District 38, and was defeated in the Democratic primary by John Mullally, 75%–25%. In 1972, he ran in District 40 and was defeated in the Democratic primary by Edward Griffith, who won the primary with a plurality of 37%.

U.S. House of Representatives

Elections
After redistricting, Towns ran for the open seat in the Brooklyn-based New York's 11th congressional district. Towns won the Democratic primary with a plurality of 48%, and won the general election with 84% of the vote. He never won a general election campaign with less than 85% of the vote. He has won the Democratic primary with at least 60% of the vote all but three times (1998, 2000, and 2006).

From 1996 to 1998, Towns was in a rivalry with Brooklyn Democratic Party Chairman Clarence Norman. In addition, he has received criticism for endorsing Republican Rudy Giuliani for Mayor of New York City in 1997. He was challenged in the 1998 primaries by Barry D. Ford, a 35-year-old lawyer with the firm of Cleary, Gottlieb, Steen & Hamilton and Harvard University alumnus, and also faced a challenge from political activist Ken Diamondstone. Towns won the primary with 55% of the vote. In 2000, Ford ran for a rematch against Towns and lost 57%–43%.

In 2006, Towns faced Democratic primary challenges from Charles Barron, a member of the New York City Council, and Roger Green, a former member of the New York State Assembly. Barron was a staunch ally of Al Sharpton. Green was convicted of stealing $3,000 in taxpayer dollars. Towns defeated Barron and Green 47%–37%–15%, the worst primary performance of his career. In 2012, Towns endorsed Barron in the race for his Congressional seat, but Barron was routed by a 72–28% margin and the seat went to Hakeem Jeffries.

Kevin Powell, a hip hop activist, writer, and former cast member on the MTV Reality TV show The Real World, opted out of challenging Towns for the 2006 Democratic nomination, challenging him in 2008 instead. Powell criticized Towns for supporting Hillary Clinton over Barack Obama in the Democratic presidential primaries. Towns defeated Powell 69%–31%.

Tenure
Towns served on the Energy and Commerce Committee and is a member of the Congressional Black Caucus. On January 7, 2009, his proposed legislation to require information on Presidential donors kicked off the new session of the 111th Congress. Towns' past accomplishments include, co-sponsoring or enacting several pieces of federal legislation, including the Student Right To Know Act, which mandated the reporting of the rate of graduation among student athletes, creating the Telecommunications Development Fund, which provides capital for minority business initiatives, and the development of a federal program for poison control centers.

He had been targeted by various Democratic Party constituencies, including factions led by his political rival Al Sharpton, and national and local labor unions, who resent his support for passage of the Central American Free Trade Agreement, which passed the House of Representatives by a razor-thin margin. In addition, he has been heavily criticized for taking money from telecom PACs and opposing net neutrality. 

He put particular emphasis on arguing in behalf of underserved Brooklyn communities, and has won recognition from several organizations for his efforts. The National Audubon Society has honored him for his efforts in fighting to secure federal funds for the restoration of Prospect Park. Towns fought to have Environmental Protection Agency testing in the aftermath of the September 11 attacks, including neighborhoods outside of the borough of Manhattan. 

Towns delayed the investigation into Countrywide Financial's VIP loan program when he was the House oversight panel's chairman by refusing to issue a subpoena for Bank of America records. After The Wall Street Journal reported that public loan documents indicated Towns had received two mortgages from the VIP program, he issued the subpoena and his office denied wrongdoing.

In December 2010, he announced that he would not seek the position of Ranking Minority Member of the Oversight Committee in the next Congress, even though his seniority and service as Chair would typically result in him filling this post. Towns reportedly withdrew due to lack of support from Nancy Pelosi, who reportedly feared Towns would not be a sufficiently aggressive leader in an anticipated struggle with incoming committee chair Darrell Issa (R-CA). Towns's successor is Elijah Cummings, who defeated Carolyn Maloney in a vote of the House Democratic Caucus.

On April 16, 2012, Towns announced his retirement. His district had been renumbered as the 8th district in redistricting and had a significant increase of white voters, though it still had a large black majority.

Committee assignments
 Committee on Energy and Commerce
 Subcommittee on Commerce, Manufacturing and Trade
 Subcommittee on Communications and Technology
 Subcommittee on Health
 Committee on Oversight and Government Reform
 Subcommittee on Government Organization, Efficiency and Financial Management (Ranking Member)

Caucus memberships
 Congressional Black Caucus
 House Democratic Caucus
 Congressional COPD Caucus
 International Conservation Caucus
 Congressional Arts Caucus

Personal life
Towns is married to the former Gwendolyn Forbes and they reside in the Cypress Hills section of Brooklyn. They have two children, Darryl (who had served in the New York State Assembly but vacated his seat to become commissioner and chief executive of New York State Homes and Community Renewal agency when appointed by Gov. Andrew Cuomo) and Deidra, who ran in special election to replace her brother, on a self-created ticket, Community First. 

He is a distant cousin of White House correspondent April Ryan.

See also
List of African-American United States representatives

References

External links

U.S. Representative Edolphus Towns official U.S. House website
Re-Elect Congressman Ed Towns official campaign website

Profile at
 

|-

|-

|-

|-

1934 births
21st-century American politicians
Adelphi University alumni
African-American members of the United States House of Representatives
African-American United States Army personnel
African-American people in New York (state) politics
Baptists from New York (state)
Baptists from North Carolina
Democratic Party members of the United States House of Representatives from New York (state)
Living people
North Carolina A&T State University alumni
People from East New York, Brooklyn
People from Columbus County, North Carolina
United States Army soldiers
Military personnel from North Carolina
Military personnel from New York (state)
21st-century African-American politicians
20th-century African-American people
Members of Congress who became lobbyists